Cross-bearer is a position in some Christian churches.

Crossbearer or Cross Bearer may also refer to:
 Cross Bearer, a 2013 horror film
 The Cross Bearer, a 1918 film produced by the World Film Company
 Crossbearer, a 1992 album by Starkweather
 "Crossbearer", a 1997 track by Cave In, from the album Beyond Hypothermia
 Crossbearer: A Memoir of Faith, a 2008 book by Joe Eszterhas